Yakutat Bay (Lingít: Yaakwdáat G̱eeyí) is a 29-km-wide (18 mi) bay in the U.S. state of Alaska, extending southwest from Disenchantment Bay to the Gulf of Alaska. "Yakutat" is a  Tlingit name reported as "Jacootat" and "Yacootat" by Yuri Lysianskyi in 1805.

Yakutat Bay was the epicenter of two major earthquakes on September 10, 1899, a magnitude 7.4 foreshock and a magnitude 8.0 main shock, 37 minutes apart.

The Shelikhov-Golikov company (precursor of the Russian-American Company), under the management of Alexander Andreyevich Baranov, founded a settlement in Yakutat Bay in 1795. It was known as New Russia, Yakutat Colony, or Slavorossiya.

Other names
Yakutat Bay has had various names.  
James Cook called it "Bering Bay".
Jean-François de La Pérouse, who visited it in 1786, named it "Baie de Monti" for one of his officers.
The same year, Captain Nathaniel Portlock named it "Admiralty Bay"
The Spanish called it "Almirantazgo."
It was also called "Port Mulgrave" when Alessandro Malaspina and José de Bustamante y Guerra visited the bay in 1791.
Yuri Lisyansky called it "Jacootat" or "Yacootat" when he visited in 1805.

References

External links
Marine Forecast  for Yakutat Bay from the National Weather Service

Bays of Alaska
Bodies of water of Yakutat City and Borough, Alaska